The Baptist Convention of New Mexico (BCNM) is a group of churches affiliated with the Southern Baptist Convention located in the New Mexico. Headquartered in Albuquerque, New Mexico, the convention is made up of 13 Baptist associations and around 325 churches as of 2010.

Affiliated Organizations 
The Baptist New Mexican - the state newspaper
Church Finance Corporation
Inlow Baptist Camp and Conference Center
New Mexico Baptist Children's Home
New Mexico Baptist Foundation
Sivells Baptist Retreat and Conference Center

References

External links
Baptist Convention of New Mexico

Baptist Christianity in New Mexico
Conventions associated with the Southern Baptist Convention